See also Victorian Certificate of Applied Learning (VCAL), vCalendar.

vCal is an open source calendar standard for Vision PIM. VCal can export itself to an RSS/RDF/WDP feed or publish itself to the internet using WebDAV and PHP. It can be exported to the iCalendar or vCalendar formats as well. VCal is not to be confused with the better known vCalendar format in that it is a completely different format.

 VisionDocument=VCAL;
 VisionVersion=1.0;
 X-Generator=Vision Calendar;
                                                                                
 {calendar}
 Name=Test%spCalendar;
 X-Description=Some%spdescription%spabout%spmy%spcalendar;
                                                                                
 {events}
 EVENT[1]=START_T:07+29+30;END_T:07+45+59;START_D:06+11+2004;END_D:06+11+2004;
 LAST_DAY:false;LOCATION:Home;NAME:Test;NOTE:Test;CATEGORIES:%c1+%c2
                                                                                
 {tasks}
 TASK[1]=START_T:07+29+30;END_T:07+45+59;START_D:06+11+2004;END_D:06+11+2004;
 LAST_DAY:false;LOCATION:Home;NAME:Test;NOTE:Test;CATEGORIES:%c2;
 STATUS:important;PRIORITY:high;COMPLETED;false;PERCOMPLETE:90;
                                                                                
 {categories}
 CATEGORY[1]=NAME:personal;COLOUR:blue;
 CATEGORY[2]=NAME:holiday;COLOUR:red;
                                                                                
 {X-filehistory}
 X-FILEHISTORY=true;
 X-BEGIN-->Sat, 06 Nov 2004 07:36:15 SAST;
 X-SAVE-->Sat, 06 Nov 2004 07:37:00 SAST;
 X-SAVE-->Sat, 06 Nov 2004 07:44:52 SAST;
 X-CREATE-->Sat, 06 Nov 2004 07:50:25 SAST "wdp feed";

Computer file formats